This is a taxonomic list of species in the extinct mammalian order Multituberculata.

Order †Multituberculata

Suborder †Plagiaulacida 
 Family †Paulchoffatiidae 
 subfamily †Paulchoffatiinae 
 Genus †Paulchoffatia 
 Species †P. delgador 
 Genus †Pseudobolodon 
 Species †P. oreas 
 Species †P. krebsi 
 Genus †Henkelodon 
 Species †H. naias 
 Genus †Guimarotodon 
 Species †G. leiriensis 
 Genus †Meketibolodon 
 Species †M. robustus 
 Genus †Plesiochoffatia 
 Species †P. thoas 
 Species †P. peparethos 
 Species †P. staphylos 
 Genus †Xenachoffatia 
 Species †X. oinopion 
 Genus †Bathmochoffatia 
 Species †B. hapax 
 Genus †Kielanodon 
 Species †K. hopsoni 
 Genus †Meketichoffatia 
 Species †M. krausei 
 Genus †Galveodon 
 Species †G. nannothus 
 Genus †Sunnyodon 
 Species †S. notleyi 
 Subfamily †Kuehneodontinae 
 Genus †Kuehneodon 
 Species †K. dietrichi 
 Species †K. barcasensis 
 Species †K. dryas 
 Species †K. guimarotensis 
 Species †K. hahni 
 Species †K. simpsoni 
 Species †K. uniradiculatus 
 Family †Pinheirodontidae 
 Genus †Pinheirodon 
 Species †P. pygmaeus 
 Species †P. vastus 
 Genus †Bernardodon 
 Species †B. atlanticus 
 Species †B. sp. 
 Genus †Gerhardodon 
 Species †G. purbeckensis 
 Genus †Iberodon 
 Species †I. quadrituberculatus 
 Genus †Lavocatia 
 Species †L. alfambrensis 
 Genus †Ecprepaulax 
 Species †E. anomala 
 Family †Allodontidae 
 Genus †Ctenacodon 
 Species †C. serratus 
 Species †C. nanus 
 Species †C. laticeps 
 Species †C. scindens 
 Genus †Psalodon 
 Species †P. potens 
 Species †P. fortis 
 Species †P. marshi 
 Family †Zofiabaataridae 
 Genus †Zofiabaatar 
 Species †Z. pulcher 
 Family Incertae sedis
 Genus †Glirodon 
 Species †G. grandis 
 Family †Plagiaulacidae 
 Genus? †Morrisonodon 
 Species? †M. brentbaatar 
 Genus †Plagiaulax 
 Species †P. becklesii 
 Genus †Bolodon 
 Species †B. crassidens 
 Species †B. falconeri 
 Species †B. minor 
 Species †B. osborni 
 Species †B. elongatus 
 Family †Eobaataridae 
 Genus †Eobaatar 
 Species †E. magnus 
 Species †E. minor 
 Species †E. hispanicus 
 Species †E. pajaronensis 
 Genus †Iberica 
 Species †Iberica hahni 
 Genus †Loxaulax 
 Species †L. valdensis 
 Genus †Monobaatar 
 Species †M. mimicus 
 Genus †Parendotherium 
 Species †P. herreroi 
 Genus †Sinobaatar 
 Species †S. lingyuanensis 
 Species †S. xiei 
 Species †S. fuxinensis 
 Genus †Heishanobaatar 
 Species †H. triangulus 
 Genus †Liaobaatar 
 Species †L. changi 
 Genus †Hakusanobaatar 
 Species †H. matsuoi 
 Genus †Tedoribaatar 
 Species †T. reini 
 Genus †Teutonodon 
 Species †Teutonodon langenbergensis 
 Family †Albionbaataridae 
 Genus †Albionbaatar 
 Species †A. denisae 
 Genus †Proalbionbaatar 
 Species †P. plagiocyrtus 
 Genus †Kielanobaatar 
 Species †K. badaohaoensis 
 Family †Arginbaataridae 
 Genus †Arginbaatar 
 Species †A. dmitrievae

Suborder †Gondwanatheria

Family †Groeberiidae Patterson, 1952
 †G. minoprioi Ryan Patterson, 1952
 †G. pattersoni G. G. Simpson, 1970
 ?†K. charrieri Flynn & Wyss 1999
 ?†K. major Goin et al. 2010
 ?†E. verticalis Goin et al. 2010
 ?†P. aberrans Goin et al. 2010
Family †Ferugliotheriidae Bonaparte 1986
 †Ferugliotherium windhauseni Bonaparte 1986a [Vucetichia Bonaparte 1990; Vucetichia gracilis Bonaparte 1990]
 †Trapalcotherium matuastensis Rougier et al. 2008
Family †Sudamericidae Scillato-Yané & Pascual 1984 [Gondwanatheridae Bonaparte 1986]
 †Greniodon sylvanicus Goin et al. 2012
 †Vintana sertichi Krause et al. 2014
 †Dakshina jederi Wilson, Das Sarama & Anantharaman 2007
 †Gondwanatherium patagonicum Bonaparte 1986
 †Sudamerica ameghinoi Scillato-Yané & Pascual 1984
 †Lavanify miolaka Krause et al. 1997
 †Bharattherium bonapartei Prasad et al. 2007
 †Patagonia peregrina Pascual & Carlini 1987

Suborder †Cimolodonta 
Superfamily Incertae sedis
 Family Incertae sedis
 Subfamily Incertae sedis
 Genus? †Ameribaatar 
 Species? †A. zofiae 
 Genus †Ptilodus 
 Species †P. serratus 
 Genus? †Uzbekbaatar 
 Species? †U. kizylkumensis 
 Paracimexomys group 
 Genus Paracimexomys 
 Species? †P. crossi 
 Species †P. magnus  [Cimexomys magnus ]
 Species †P. magister  [Cimexomys magister ]
 Species †P. perplexus 
 Species †P. robisoni 
 Species †P. priscus  [Cimexomys priscus ; genotype Paracimexomys sensu ]
 Species †P. propriscus 
 Genus Cimexomys 
 Species †C. antiquus 
 Species †C. gregoryi 
 Species †C. judithae  [Paracimexomys? judithae ]
 Species †C. arapahoensis
 Species †C. minor 
 Species? †C. gratus  [Cimexomys hausoi ; Eucosmodon gratus ; Mesodma? ambigua? ; Stygimus gratus ]
 Genus †Bryceomys 
 Species †B. fumosus 
 Species †B. hadrosus 
 Species †B. intermedius 
 Genus †Cedaromys 
 Species †C. bestia  [=Paracimexomys? bestia 
 Species †C. parvus 
 Genus? †Dakotamys ; E. Cret. CNA.
 Species †D. malcolmi 
 Family †Boffidae 
 Genus †Boffius 
 Species †Boffius splendidus  [Boffiidae  sensu ]
 Family †Cimolomyidae  sensu 
 Genus †Essonodon 
 Species? †E. browni  [cimolodontidae?  
 Genus †Buginbaatar 
 Species? †B. transaltaiensis 
 Genus †Meniscoessus  [Dipriodon , Tripriodon , Selenacodon , Halodon , Oracodon ]
 Species †M. caperatus 
 Species †M. collomensis 
 Species †M. ferox 
 Species †M. intermedius 
 Species †M. major 
 Species †M. robustus 
 Species †M. seminoensis 
 Genus †Cimolomys  [=? Allacodon ; Selenacodon ]
 Species †C. clarki 
 Species †C. gracilis  [Cimolomys digona ; Meniscoessus brevis; Ptilodus gracilis ; Selenacodon brevis ]
 Species †C. trochuus
 Species †C. milliensis 
Superfamily †Ptilodontoidea  sensu  e 
 Family †Cimolodontidae  sensu 
 Genus †Liotomus 
 Species? †L. marshi  [Neoctenacodon marshi ?] [eucosmodontidae? 
 Genus †Anconodon 
 Species? †A. lewisi 
 Species †A. gibleyi 
 Species †A. cochranensis  [Liotomus russelli ; Ectopodon cochranensis 
 Genus †Cimolodon  [Nanomys , Nonomyops 
 Species †C. electus
 Species †C. nitidus  [Allacodon rarus  sensu ; Nanomys minutus ; Nonomyops minutus 
 Species †C. parvus
 Species †C. similis 
 Family Incertae sedis
 Genus Neoliotomus 
 Species †N. conventus 
 Species †N. ultimus 
 Family †Neoplagiaulacidae  [Neoplagiaulacinae ]
 Genus †Mesodma 
 Species? †M. hensleighi
 Species? †M. senecta
 Species? †M. garfieldensis 
 Species? †M. pygmaea 
 Species †M. formosa  [Halodon formosus 
 Species †M. primaeva [Perectypodus primaeva]
 Species †M. thompsoni 
 Genus Ectypodus  [Charlesmooria 
 Species †E. aphronorus 
 Species? †E. childei 
 Species? †E. elaphus 
 Species? †E. lovei 
 Species †E. musculus 
 Species †E. powelli 
 Species? †E. simpsoni 
 Species †E. szalayi 
 Species †E. tardus 
 Genus †Mimetodon 
 Species †M. krausei 
 Species †M. nanophus  [Neoplagiaulax nanophus 
 Species †M. siberlingi
 Species †M. churchilli 
 Genus †Neoplagiaulax 
 Species †N. annae 
 Species? †N. burgessi 
 Species †N. cimolodontoides 
 Species †N. copei 
 Species †N. donaldorum 
 Species †N. eocaenus 
 Species †N. grangeri 
 Species †N. hazeni 
 Species †N. hunteri 
 Species †N. jepi 
 Species †N. kremnus 
 Species †N. macintyrei 
 Species †N. macrotomeus 
 Species †N. mckennai 
 Species †N. nelsoni 
 Species †N. nicolai 
 Species †N. paskapooensis 
 Species? †N. serrator 
 Species †N. sylvani 
 Genus †Parectypodus 
 Species †P. armstrongi 
 Species? †P. corystes 
 Species? †P. foxi 
 Species †P. laytoni 
 Species †P. lunatus  [P. childei Kühne, 1969]
 Species †P. simpsoni 
 Species †P. sinclairi 
 Species †P. sloani 
 Species †P. trovessartianus 
 Species †P. sylviae  [Ectypodus sylviae ]
 Species? †P. vanvaleni 
 Genus †Cernaysia 
 Species †C. manueli 
 Species †C. davidi 
 Genus †Krauseia 
 Species †K. clemensi  [Parectypodus clemensi ]
 Genus †Xyronomys
 Species †X. swainae 
 Genus †Xanclomys 
 Species †X. mcgrewi
 Genus †Mesodmops
 Species †M. dawsonae 
 Family †Ptilodontidae  [Ptilodontinae  sensu ]
 Genus †Kimbetohia 
 Species †K. cambi []
 Species †K. mziae []
 Genus †Ptilodus  [Chirox ]
 Species? †P. fractus
 Species †P. kummae 
 Species †P. gnomus 
 Species †P. mediaevus   [Ptilodus plicatus ; Chirox plicatus  P. ferronensis ]
 Species †P. montanus [P. gracilis ; P. admiralis ]
 Species †P. tsosiensis 
 Species †P. wyomingensis  
 Genus †Baiotomeus 
 Species †B. douglassi  [Mimetodon]
 Species †B. lamberti 
 Species †B. russelli 
 Species †B. rhothonion 
 Genus †Prochetodon 
 Species †P. cavus 
 Species †P. foxi 
 Species †P. taxus 
 Species †P. speirsae 
 Family †Kogaionidae 
 Genus †Kogaionon 
 Species †K. ungureanui 
 Genus †Hainina 
 Species †H. belgica 
 Species †H. godfriauxi 
 Species †H. pyrenaica 
 Species †H. vianeyae 
 Genus †Barbatodon 
 Species †B. transylvanicum 
 Family †Eucosmodontidae  sensu  [Eucosmodontidae: Eucosmodontinae Jepsen, 1940 sensu McKenna & Bell, 1997]
 Genus †Clemensodon
 Species †C. megaloba  [Kimbetohia cambi, in partim]
 Genus †Eucosmodon 
 Species †E. primus []
 Species †E. americanus 
 Species †E. molestus  (1886?) [Neoplagiaulax  molestus ]
 Genus †Stygimys 
 Species †S. camptorhiza 
 Species †S. cupressus 
 Species †S. kuszmauli [Eucosmodon kuszmauli]
 Species †S. jepseni 
 Species †S. teilhardi 
 Family †Microcosmodontidae  [Eucosmodontidae: Microcosmodontinae  sensu ]
 Genus †Pentacosmodon
 Species †P. pronus  [Djadochtatheroid? ]
 Genus †Acheronodon 
 Species †A. garbani 
 Genus †Microcosmodon 
 Species †M. conus 
 Species †M. rosei 
 Species †M. arcuatus 
 Species †M. woodi  [Eucosmodontine?]
 Species †M. harleyi 
Superfamily †Djadochtatherioidea  sensu [Djadochtatheria ]
 Genus? †Bulganbaatar
 Species? †B. nemegtbaataroides 
 Genus? †Chulsanbaatar 
 Species? †C. vulgaris  Chulsanbaataridae  
 Genus †Nemegtbaatar 
 Species? †N. gobiensis  
 Family †Sloanbaataridae  
 Genus †Kamptobaatar 
 Species? †K. kuczynskii 
 Genus †Nessovbaatar 
 Species †N. multicostatus 
 Genus †Sloanbaatar 
 Species †S. mirabilis  [Sloanbaatarinae]
 Family †Djadochtatheriidae  
 Genus †Djadochtatherium
 Species †D. matthewi  [Catopsalis matthewi ]
 Genus †Catopsbaatar 
 Species †C. catopsaloides  [Djadochtatherium catopsaloides  ]
 Genus †Tombaatar 
 Species †T. sabuli Rougier, Novacek & Dashzeveg, 1997
 Genus †Kryptobaatar  [Gobibaatar  , Tugrigbaatar  ]
 Species †K. saichanensis   [Tugrigbaatar saichaenensis  ]
 Species †K. dashzevegi  
 Species †K. mandahuensis  
 Species †K. gobiensis    [Gobibaatar parvus   ]
Superfamily †Taeniolabidoidea 
 Genus †Prionessus 
 Species †P. lucifer 
 Family †Lambdopsalidae
 Genus †Lambdopsalis 
 Species †L. bulla 
 Genus †Sphenopsalis 
 Species †S. nobilis 
 Family †Taeniolabididae 
 Genus †Taeniolabis 
 Species †T. lamberti 
 Species †T. taoensis 
 Genus †Kimbetopsalis
 Species †K. simmonsae